is a Japanese mixed martial artist who has competed mainly for Pancrase, Shooto and Greatest Common Multiple.

Mixed martial arts career

Early career
Murayama started his professional career in 2003. In his first years, he fought mainly for Greatest Common Multiple, also known as GCM, but in 2005 he transitioned to Shooto and remained there until 2008.

With a professional record of nine victories, two defeats and four draws, Murayama returned to the GCM, this time to fight in Cage Force.

Cage Force
Murayama wasn't successful in Cage Force. Under the promotion's banner, he amassed two losses and one draw. Counting his loss against Yoichiro Sato at Shooto: Shooting Disco 9, he stood with a total record of nine victories, five defeats and five draws.

In the second half of 2010, Murayama returned to Shooto.

Shooto Pacific Rim title
Murayama had a rematch against Yoichiro Sato on February 26, 2011 at Shooto: Shooting Disco 14 for the Shooto Pacific Rim middleweight (168 lb) title. Sato retained the title, as the judges ruled the match a draw (29–28 Murayama, 29–28 Sato, 29–29).

Murayama faced Sato a third time — and once again for the title — on June 11, 2011 at Shooto: Shooting Disco 15. This time Murayama won via unanimous decision (30–27, 30–27, 30–27) and became the new Shooto Pacific Rim 168–pound champion.

Murayama faced Sengoku welterweight champion and former Shooto Pacific Rim middleweight champion Keita Nakamura on September 23, 2011 at Shooto: Shootor's Legacy 4 in a non–title bout. He defeated Nakamura via submission due to a rear-naked choke in the very first round.

Pancrase
Murayama faced welterweight King of Pancrase Takenori Sato on March 17, 2013 at Pancrase 246. The match was ruled a draw.

Murayama faced longtime mixed martial arts veteran Yuki Kondo on June 30, 2013 at Pancrase 248. Murayama defeated Kondo via unanimous decision.

Murayama faced Gota Yamashita on August 10, 2014 at Pancrase 260 for the vacant welterweight King of Pancrase title. Yamashita lost via unanimous decision after three rounds.

Welterweight King of Pancrase
After racking up three straight wins in Pancrase, Murayama challenged Shingo Suzuki for the Welterweight King of Pancrase at Pancrase 276 on March 12, 2016. He won the fight via fourth-round technical knockout and claimed the championship.

As his first title defense attempt, Murayama faced Hiromitsu Miura at Pancrase 281 on October 2, 2016. He lost the fight and championship via unanimous decision.

Post-title reign
After losing his title, Murayama faced Takashi Sato at Pancrase 292 on December 10, 2017. He lost the fight via first-round technical knockout.

Muarayama then faced Takaaki Nara at Pancrase 296 on May 20, 2018. He won the fight via first-minute technical submission.

Murayama faced Hiroyuki Tetsuka at Pancrase 302 on December 9, 2018. He lost the bout via unanimous decision.

Murayama then fought Yuki Kondo at Pancrase 312 on February 16, 2020, winning the fight via unanimous decision.

Murayama next faced Masayuki Kikuiri at Pancrase 320 on December 13, 2020. Murayama won the bout via unanimous decision.

Murayama and Kikuiri were then scheduled for a rematch for the interim Welterweight King of Pancrase title at Pancrase 324 on October 17, 2021. Kikuiri won the bout via unanimous decision.

Murayama then faced Yusaku Kinoshita at Pancrase 327 on April 29, 2022. He lost the fight via first-round knockout.

Championships and accomplishments

Mixed martial arts
Shooto
Shooto Pacific Rim 168 lb title (one time)
Pancrase
Welterweight King of Pancrase (One time; former)

Mixed martial arts record

|-
| Loss
| align=center| 22–12–9
| Yusaku Kinoshita
| KO (flying knee)
| Pancrase: 327
| 
| align=center| 1
| align=center| 1:48
| Tokyo, Japan
|
|-
| Loss
| align=center| 22–11–9
| Masayuki Kikuiri
| Decision (unanimous)
| Pancrase: 324
| 
| align=center| 5
| align=center| 5:00
| Tokyo, Japan
|
|-
| Win
| align=center| 22–10–9
| Masayuki Kikuiri
| Decision (unanimous)
| Pancrase: 320
| 
| align=center| 3
| align=center| 5:00
| Tokyo, Japan
|
|-
| Win
| align=center| 21–10–9
| Yuki Kondo
| Decision (unanimous)
| Pancrase: 312
| 
| align=center| 3
| align=center| 5:00
| Tokyo, Japan
|
|-
| Loss
| align=center| 20–10–9
| J.J. Ambrose
| Decision (unanimous)
| Pancrase: 306
| 
| align=center| 3
| align=center| 5:00
| Tokyo, Japan
|
|-
| Loss
| align=center| 20–9–9
| Hiroyuki Tetsuka
| Decision (unanimous)
| Pancrase: 302
| 
| align=center| 3
| align=center| 5:00
| Tokyo, Japan
|
|-
| Win
| align=center| 20–8–9
| Takaaki Nara
| Technical Submission (rear-naked choke)
| Pancrase: 296
| 
| align=center| 1
| align=center| 0:48
| Tokyo, Japan
|
|-
| Loss
| align=center| 19–8–9
| Takashi Sato
| TKO (punches)
| Pancrase: 292
| 
| align=center| 1
| align=center| 4:15
| Tokyo, Japan
|
|-
| Loss
| align=center| 19–7–9
| Hiromitsu Miura
| Decision (unanimous)
| Pancrase 281
| 
| align=center| 5
| align=center| 5:00
| Tokyo, Japan
| 
|-
| Win
| align=center| 19–6–9
| Shingo Suzuki
| KO (punches)
| Pancrase 276
| 
| align=center| 4
| align=center| 3:33
| Tokyo, Japan
| 
|-
| Win
| align=center| 18–6–9
| Kosei Kubota
| Decision (unanimous)
| Pancrase 270
| 
| align=center| 3
| align=center| 5:00
| Tokyo, Japan 
|
|-
| Win
| align=center| 17–6–9
| Daniel Roberts
| Decision (split)
| Pancrase 266
| 
| align=center| 3
| align=center| 5:00
| Tokyo, Japan
|
|-
| Win
| align=center| 16–6–9
| Shingo Suzuki
| TKO (punches)
| Pancrase 263
| 
| align=center| 3
| align=center| 0:27
| Tokyo, Japan
| 
|-
| Loss
| align=center| 15–6–9
| Gota Yamashita
| Decision (unanimous)
| Pancrase 260
| 
| align=center| 3
| align=center| 3:00
| Tokyo, Japan
| 
|-
| Win
| align=center| 15–5–9
| Thiago Gonçalves
| Decision (unanimous)
| Pancrase 257
| 
| align=center| 3
| align=center| 5:00
| Yokohama, Kanagawa, Japan
| 
|-
| Draw
| align=center| 14–5–9
| Yuya Shirai
| Draw (majority)
| DEEP: Tribe Tokyo Fight
| 
| align=center| 3
| align=center| 5:00
| Tokyo, Japan
| 
|-
| Win
| align=center| 14–5–8
| Yuki Kondo
| Decision (unanimous)
| Pancrase 248
| 
| align=center| 3
| align=center| 5:00
| Tokyo, Japan
| 
|-
| Draw
| align=center| 13–5–8
| Takenori Sato
| Draw (unanimous)
| Pancrase 246
| 
| align=center| 3
| align=center| 5:00
| Tokyo, Japan
| 
|-
| Win
| align=center| 13–5–7
| Yuta Nakamura
| Decision (unanimous)
| Pancrase 245
| 
| align=center| 2
| align=center| 5:00
| Tokyo, Japan
| 
|-
| Draw
| align=center| 12–5–7
| Sojiro Orui
| Draw (majority)
| Pancrase: Progress Tour 9
| 
| align=center| 3
| align=center| 5:00
| Tokyo, Japan
| 
|-
| Win
| align=center| 12–5–6
| Keita Nakamura
| Submission (rear-naked choke)
| Shooto: Shootor's Legacy 4
| 
| align=center| 1
| align=center| 2:30
| Tokyo, Japan
| 
|-
| Win
| align=center| 11–5–6
| Yoichiro Sato
| Decision (unanimous)
| Shooto: Shooting Disco 15: Try Hard, Japan!
| 
| align=center| 3
| align=center| 5:00
| Tokyo, Japan
| 
|-
| Draw
| align=center| 10–5–6
| Yoichiro Sato
| Draw
| Shooto: Shooting Disco 14: 365-Step March
| 
| align=center| 3
| align=center| 5:00
| Tokyo, Japan
| 
|-
| Win
| align=center| 10–5–5
| Jung Min Kang
| Submission (rear-naked choke)
| Shooto: Gig Tokyo 5
| 
| align=center| 1
| align=center| 2:30
| Tokyo, Japan
| 
|-
| Loss
| align=center| 9–5–5
| Kenta Takagi
| KO (elbow)
| GCM: Cage Force 16
| 
| align=center| 1
| align=center| 0:48
| Tokyo, Japan
| 
|-
| Loss
| align=center| 9–4–5
| Yoichiro Sato
| Decision (unanimous)
| Shooto: Shooting Disco 9: Superman
| 
| align=center| 2
| align=center| 5:00
| Tokyo, Japan
| 
|-
| Draw
| align=center| 9–3–5
| Ikkei Nagamura
| Draw
| GCM: Cage Force 10
| 
| align=center| 3
| align=center| 3:00
| Tokyo, Japan
| 
|-
| Loss
| align=center| 9–3–4
| Rikuhei Fujii
| Decision (unanimous)
| GCM: Cage Force 7
| 
| align=center| 3
| align=center| 5:00
| Tokyo, Japan
| 
|-
| Win
| align=center| 9–2–4
| Hiroki Sato
| Decision (unanimous)
| Shooto: Shooting Disco 4: Born in the Fighting
| 
| align=center| 2
| align=center| 5:00
| Tokyo, Japan
| 
|-
| Win
| align=center| 8–2–4
| Makoto Maeda
| TKO (punches)
| Shooto: Shooting Disco 3: Everybody Fight Now
| 
| align=center| 1
| align=center| 3:57
| Tokyo, Japan
| 
|-
| Win
| align=center| 7–2–4
| Akihiko Adachi
| Submission (armbar)
| Shooto: Shooting Disco 2: The Heat Rises Tonight
| 
| align=center| 2
| align=center| 2:29
| Tokyo, Japan
| 
|-
| Win
| align=center| 6–2–4
| Seiji Furukawa
| Submission (keylock)
| Shooto 2006: It's Strong Being a Man
| 
| align=center| 1
| align=center| 0:39
| Setagaya, Tokyo, Japan
| 
|-
| Draw
| align=center| 5–2–4
| Akihiko Adachi
| Draw
| Shooto 2006: 10/1 in Kitazawa Town Hall
| 
| align=center| 2
| align=center| 5:00
| Setagaya, Tokyo, Japan
| 
|-
| Draw
| align=center| 5–2–3
| Osami Shibuya
| Draw
| GCM: D.O.G. 6
| 
| align=center| 2
| align=center| 5:00
| Tokyo, Japan
| 
|-
| Win
| align=center| 5–2–2
| Masashi Yozen
| Decision (unanimous)
| Shooto: Soulful Fight
| 
| align=center| 2
| align=center| 5:00
| Setagaya, Tokyo, Japan
| 
|-
| Win
| align=center| 4–2–2
| Yoshinori Ashikawa
| TKO (punches)
| Shooto: Shooter's Summer
| 
| align=center| 1
| align=center| 0:25
| Setagaya, Tokyo, Japan
| 
|-
| Win
| align=center| 3–2–2
| Nobuyuki Shimakawa
| TKO (punches)
| Shooto: 6/3 in Kitazawa Town Hall
| 
| align=center| 1
| align=center| 2:16
| Setagaya, Tokyo, Japan
| 
|-
| Loss
| align=center| 2–2–2
| Petras Markevicius
| Decision
| Shooto Lithuania: Bushido
| 
| align=center| 2
| align=center| 5:00
| Vilnius, Lithuania
| 
|-
| Draw
| align=center| 2–1–2
| Wataru Takahashi
| Draw
| GCM: Demolition 2nd Anniversary Show
| 
| align=center| 2
| align=center| 5:00
| Tokyo, Japan
| 
|-
| Win
| align=center| 2–1–1
| Dai Moriyama
| TKO (corner stoppage)
| GCM: Demolition 16
| 
| align=center| 2
| align=center| 1:56
| Tokyo, Japan
| 
|-
| Loss
| align=center| 1–1–1
| Ryuhei Sato
| Decision (unanimous)
| Shooto 2004: 4/16 in Kitazawa Town Hall
| 
| align=center| 2
| align=center| 5:00
| Setagaya, Tokyo, Japan
| 
|-
| Draw
| align=center| 1–0–1
| Shinpei Sotoyama
| Draw
| GCM: Demolition 12
| 
| align=center| 2
| align=center| 5:00
| Tokyo, Japan
| 
|-
| Win
| align=center| 1–0
| Kenji Nagai
| Submission (armbar)
| GCM: Demolition 11
| 
| align=center| 1
| align=center| 4:42
| Tokyo, Japan
|

References

1980 births
Living people
Sportspeople from Nagano Prefecture
Japanese male mixed martial artists
Welterweight mixed martial artists
Mixed martial artists utilizing shootfighting
Mixed martial artists utilizing shoot wrestling
Mixed martial artists utilizing pankration
Mixed martial artists utilizing judo
Japanese male judoka
People from Matsumoto, Nagano